In mathematics, the Clebsch diagonal cubic surface, or Klein's icosahedral cubic surface, is a non-singular cubic surface, studied by  and , all of whose 27 exceptional lines
can be defined over the real numbers. The term Klein's icosahedral surface can refer to either this surface or its blowup at the 10 Eckardt points.

Definition

The Clebsch surface is the set of points (x0:x1:x2:x3:x4) of P4 satisfying the equations

Eliminating x0 shows that it is also isomorphic to the surface

in P3.

Properties

The symmetry group of the Clebsch surface is the symmetric group S5 of order 120, acting by permutations of the coordinates (in P4). Up to isomorphism, the Clebsch surface is the only cubic surface with this automorphism group.

The 27 exceptional lines are:
 The 15 images (under S5) of the  line of points of the form (a : −a : b : −b : 0).
 The 12 images of the line though the point (1:ζ: ζ2: ζ3: ζ4) and its complex conjugate, where ζ is a primitive 5th root of 1.

The surface has 10 Eckardt points where 3 lines meet,  given by the point
(1 : −1 : 0 : 0 : 0) and its conjugates under permutations.  showed that the surface obtained by blowing up the Clebsch surface in its 10 Eckardt points is the Hilbert modular surface of  the level 2 principal congruence subgroup of the Hilbert modular group of the field Q(). The quotient of the Hilbert modular group by its level 2 congruence subgroup is isomorphic to the alternating group of order 60 on 5 points.

Like all nonsingular cubic surfaces, the Clebsch cubic can be obtained by blowing up the projective plane in 6 points.  described these points as follows. If the projective plane is identified with the set of lines through the origin in a 3-dimensional vector space containing an icosahedron centered at the origin, then the 6 points correspond to the 6 lines through the icosahedron's 12 vertices. The Eckardt points correspond to the 10 lines through the centers of the 20 faces.

References

External links

Clebsch Surface, John Baez, 1 March, 2016, AMS Visual Insight Blog
Algebraic surfaces